Walter M. Brasch (March 2, 1945 – February 9, 2017) was an American social issues journalist and university professor of journalism.  He was the author of a weekly syndicated newspaper column and the author of 17 books. He was a newspaper editor in California, Iowa, Indiana, and Ohio, and a senior editor at OpEdNews., He died on February 9, 2017.

Education
Dr. Brasch earned an A.B. in sociology from San Diego State College, an M.A. in journalism from Ball State University, and a Ph.D. in mass communication and journalism, with a cognate area in language and culture studies, from Ohio University.

Awards
Brasch won more than 100 national and regional awards from the National Society of Newspaper Columnists, Society of Professional Journalists, National Federation of Press Women, Pennsylvania Press Club, Pennsylvania Women's Press Association, Pennwriters, International Association of Business Communicators, Pacific Coast Press Club, and Press Club of Southern California.

He was not only a co-recipient of the Civil Liberties Award of the American Civil Liberties Union in 1996, but was also honored by San Diego State University as a Points of Excellence winner in 1997. At Bloomsburg University, he earned the Creative Arts Award, was the first recipient of the Creative Teaching Award, and the first to receive a second award. He was named an Outstanding Student Advisor. He was the first recipient of the Dean's Award of Excellence at Bloomsburg University. For the Pennsylvania Humanities Council, he was a Commonwealth Speaker. In 2004 he was the faculty recipient of the Martin Luther King Jr. Distinguished Humanitarian Service Award.

Published works
He co-authored Social Foundations of the Mass Media (2001) and The Press and the State (1986), and was awarded Outstanding Academic Book distinction by Choice magazine, published by the American Library Association.

References

External links
 http://www.walterbrasch.com

1945 births
American newspaper journalists
Ball State University alumni
San Diego State University alumni
Ohio University alumni
Place of death missing
2017 deaths